Denys Kireyev (1 January 1977 – 5 March 2022) was a Ukrainian banker and intelligence officer. 

On 23 February 2022, Kireyev obtained information that Antonov Airport would be the site of the main attack of the 2022 Russian invasion of Ukraine, which allowed Ukraine to repel the initial assault on the airport and damage it heavily enough that it could not be used by Russia. Following the invasion on 24 February, he joined the 28 February peace negotiations in Gomel, Belarus. He was killed a week later by the Security Service of Ukraine (SBU).

According to Kyrylo Budanov, chief of the Main Directorate of Intelligence of the Ministry of Defense of Ukraine, if it was not for the information given by Kireyev, Kyiv would have probably fallen.

Banking career 

In 2010–2014, he was First Deputy Chairman of the Board of Oschadbank, and prior to that he was a member of the supervisory board of Ukreximbank. He also worked for Citibank, Credit Lyonnais, ING Group, and Rabobank.

Death 

Kireyev died on 5 March 2022. According to preliminary reports in Russian and Ukrainian media, he was suspected of working as a double agent for Russia and was killed by the Security Service of Ukraine (SBU) while trying to escape detention. According to these reports, he was suspected of treason, and the SBU held records of telephone conversations as evidence. The Ukrainian Ministry of Defence's Directorate of Intelligence subsequently confirmed Kireyev's death in a Facebook post, but asserted that he was an intelligence operative for Ukraine who died in the line of duty on a "special mission."

References 

1977 births
2022 deaths
Ukrainian bankers
People killed in the 2022 Russian invasion of Ukraine
Businesspeople from Kyiv